The 2000 World Junior Wrestling Championships were the 26th edition of the World Junior Wrestling Championships and were held in Nantes, France between 3-9 July 2000.

Medal table

Medal summary

Men's freestyle

Greco-Roman

Women's freestyle

References

External links 
 UWW Database

World Junior Championships
Wrestling Championships
International wrestling competitions hosted by France
Wrestling in France
World Junior Wrestling Championships